A peaceworker is an individual or member of an organization that undertakes to resolve violent conflict, prevent the rise of new violent conflicts, and rebuild societies damaged by war.

The term peaceworker is usually reserved for civilian, unarmed members of non-governmental organizations. Peacework is also carried out by many armed organizations such as the UN, but armed personnel are seldom called peaceworkers.

Peacework 
Peaceworker duties include the following:
 Bringing conflicting parties together, opening channels of communication and helping to broker a ceasefire or peace agreement
 Monitoring voting booths, providing technical expertise and other forms of support in order to help ensure a free and fair electioneering environment
 Providing protective accompaniment of people at risk, monitoring borders and other actions for stabilizing preserve ceasefire agreements and preserving human life
 Reintegrating ex-combatants into society
 Promoting a respect for human rights within the local and national legal system, strengthening local institutions and civil society organizations that defend human rights

Peaceworker training 
Peaceworker training and guidance are provided by organizations such as International Alert. University-provided Peace and conflict studies courses also provide valuable and relevant knowledge. As peace work can utilize a very wide variety of skills, it allows those with established, unrelated careers to take up peace work without having to abandon what they have already learned.

See also 
 Peacebuilding
 Peacekeeping
 Peacemaking
 Human rights
 Peace activist

Peaceworker organizations 
Any organization dedicated to human rights, humanitarian aid and conflict management could be said to employ peace workers. The following is just a small sample of the dozens of organizations worldwide that provide these services.
 Nonviolent Peaceforce
 International Alert
 Peace Brigades International
 Christian Peacemaker Teams

External links
 International Alert training webpage
 peacework.org
 University of Bradford: Department of Peace Studies
 The ARCA Project: A European peaceworker training network

Peace
Occupations